Go and Reclaim the Mainland is a Chinese anti-communist patriotic song created by the government of the Republic of China on Taiwan to promote Chinese reunification and Project National Glory.

Lyrics

Legacy
The song was uploaded by the hacking group Anonymous to a Chinese government tourism promotion website which they hacked on September-October 2021.

References

External links

Year of song missing
Taiwanese songs
Mandarin-language songs
Chinese patriotic songs
Anti-communism in China
Chinese irredentism
Anti-Russian sentiment